Lesléa Newman (born November 5, 1955 in Brooklyn, New York City) is an American author, editor, and feminist. Four of her young adult novels have been finalists for the Lambda Literary Award for Children's and Young Adult Literature, making her one of the most celebrated authors in the category.

Personal life 
Newman was born as Leslie Newman to Jewish parents in New York City in 1955.  She developed her pen name by combining her birth name with her Hebrew name, Leah.  Much like Sylvia Plath, Newman first began writing as a teenager by participating in poetry contests sponsored by Seventeen magazine. Newman is a lesbian.

Career 
Lesléa Newman has written and edited 70 books and anthologies. She has written about such topics as being a Jew, body image and eating disorders, lesbianism, lesbian and gay parenting, and her gender role as a femme. Her best-known work is the controversial Heather Has Two Mommies. She was later the subject of another similar controversy in 1997, when her book Belinda's Bouquet was banned by School District 36 Surrey in Surrey, British Columbia, alongside Johnny Valentine's One Dad, Two Dads, Brown Dad, Blue Dads and Rosamund Elwin and Michele Paulse's Asha's Mums. That ban was eventually overturned by the Supreme Court of Canada in its 2002 decision Chamberlain v Surrey School District No 36.

She also authored The Boy Who Cried Fabulous and Hachiko Waits in 2004.

Selected publications

Heather Has Two Mommies 

Heather Has Two Mommies, originally published in 1989 by Alyson Books and illustrated by Diana Souza, is about a young girl who has lesbian mothers. The book was republished by Candlewick Press in 2015. In 1990, many gay and lesbian couples and their children found the first reflections of their families in this picture book.

However, Heather Has Two Mommies has faced a lot of controversy. The book has landed on the American Library Association's Top 100 Most Banned and Challenged Books between Between 1990 and 1999 (7), as well as between 2010 and 2019 (87).

In the late nineties, the Wichita Falls library district faced harsh backlash from library-card holders "petition[ed] the city to move controversial materials out of the municipal library's children's section." Questionable material included Heather Has Two Mommies and Daddy's Roommate by Michael Willhoite. In 2000, a federal judge ruled that the petition was unconstitutional.

Despite controversy, the book received a favorable review from School Library Journal and has received the following accolades:

 American Library Association Rainbow List pick (2016)
 Lambda Literary Award for Children/Young Adult nominee

Saturday Is Pattyday (1993) 
Saturday is Pattyday, originally published in 1993 and illustrated by Annette Hegel, is a book about Frankie, whose two moms get divorced.The book was republished by New Victoria on December 13, 2010.

The book was nominated for the Lambda Literary Award for Children's/Young Adult.

Bibliography

Juvenile Fiction 

 Heather Has Two Mommies. Illustrated by Laura Cornell.  Alyson Press. 1989. 
 American Library Association Rainbow List pick (2016)
 Lambda Literary Award for Children/Young Adult nominee 
 Belinda's Bouquet. Illustrated by Michael WIllhoite. Alyson Wonderland. 1991.
 Gloria Goes to Gay Pride. Illustrated by Russell Crocker. Alyson Wonderland. 1991.
 Lambda Literary Award for Children's/Young Adult
 Saturday is Pattyday. Illustrated by Annette Hegel. 1993.
 Lambda Literary Award nominee for Children's/Young Adult
 Too Far Away to Touch. Illustrated by Catherine Stock. Clarion Books. December 1995.
 Remember That. Illustrated by Karen Ritz. Clarion Books. February 18, 1996.
 Matzo Ball Moon. Illustrated by Elaine Greenstein. Clarion Books. 1998.
 Cats, Cats, Cats! Illustrated by Erika Oiler. Simon & Schuster Books for Young Readers. 2001.  
 Dogs, Dogs, Dogs! Illustrated by Erika Oiler. Simon & Schuster Books for Young Readers. 2002.
 Felicia's Favorite Story. Illustrated by Adriana Romo. Two Lives Publ. 2002.
 Lambda Literary Award nominee for Children's/Young Adult
 Pigs, Pigs, Pigs! Illustrated by Erika Oiler. Simon & Schuster Books for Young Readers. 2003
 The Boy Who Cried Fabulous. Illustrated by Peter Ferguson. Tricycle Press. March 15, 2004.
 Where Is Bear? Illustrated by Valeri Gorbachev. HMH Books. October 2004. .
 Hachiko Waits. Illustrated by Machiyo Kodaira. Henry Holt and Company. October 2004.
 A Fire Engine for Ruthie. Illustrated by Cyd Moore. Clarion Books. 2004.
 The Best Cat in the Word. Illustrated by Ronald Himler. Eerdmans Books for Young Readers. 2004.
 The Eight Nights of Chanukah. Illustrated by Elivia Savadier. Harry N. Abrams. October 2005.
 Skunk's Spring Surprise. Illustrated by Valeri Gorbachev. Houghton Mifflin Harcourt. January 1, 2007.
 Daddy's Song. Illustrated by Karen RItz. Henry Holt and Company. April 17, 2007.
 Runaway Dreidel! Illustrated by Krysten Broker. Square Fish. October 2, 2007. 
 Daddy, Papa, and Me. illustrated by Carol Thompson. Tricycle Press. June 9, 2009. 
 Stonewall Book Award Nominee for Children's and Young Adult Literature (2010)
 Mommy, Mama, and Me. Illustrated by Carol Thompson. Tricycle Press. June 9, 2009.
 Stonewall Book Award Nominee for Children's and Young Adult Literature (2010)
 Just Like Mama. Illustrated by Julia Gorton. Harry N. Abrams. April 2010. 
 harMiss Tutu's Star. Illustrated by Carey Armstrong-Ellis. Harry N. Abrams. August 1, 2010.
 Donovan's Big Day. Tricycle Press. 2011. .
 A Sweet Passover. Illustrated by David Slonim. ABRAMS. March 2012. 
 A Kiss on the Keppie. Illustrated by Katherine Blackmore. Amazon Publishing. 2012.
 Here Is the World: A Year of Jewish Holidays. Illustrated by Susan Gal. ABRAMS. September 2, 2014.
 My Name is Aviva. Lerner Publishing Group. August 2015.
 Ketzel, the Cat who Composed Illustrated by Amy June Bates. Candlewick Press. 2015.
 Association of Jewish Libraries Sydney Taylor Award Winner (2016)
 Hanukkah Delight! Illustrated by Amy Husband. Lerner Publishing Group.. 2016.
 Sparkle Boy. Illustrated by Maria Mola. Lee & Low Books Incorporated. 2017. 
 Baby's Blessings. Lerner Publishing Group. October 2019. .
Gittel's Journey: An Ellis Island Story. Illustrated by Amy June Bates. ABRAMS. February 5, 2019.
 Welcoming Elijah: A Passover with a Tale. Illustrated by Susan Gal. Charlesbridge Publishing, Incorporated. January 28, 2020.
 National Jewish Book Award for Children's Picture Books
 Golden Kite Award nominee for Picture Book Illustration
 Remembering Ethan. Illustrated by Tracy Nishimura Bishop. American Psychological Association. 2020.
 1 2 3 Cats: A Cat Counting Book. Illustrated by Isabella Kung. Candlewick Press. April 29, 2021. .
 ABC Cats: An Alpha-Cat Book. Illustrated by Isabella Kung. Candlewick Press. May 4, 2021.
 As Babies Dream. Illustrated by Taia Morley. American Psychological Association. 2021.
 Alicia and the Hurricane: A Story of Puetro Rico with Georgina Lazaro Leon. Illustrated by Elizabeth Erazo Baez. Children's Book Press. March 2022.

Young Adult Fiction 

 Good Enough to Eat: A Novel. Firebrand Books. 1986.
 Fat Chance. Livewire. 1994.
 Jailbait. Delacorte Press. 2005.

Adult Fiction 

 In Every Laugh a Tear: A Novel. New Victoria Publishers. 1992.
 The Reluctant Daughter. Bold Strokes Books. 2009.

Short Story Collections 

 A Letter to Harvey Milk: Short Stories. University of Wisconsin Press. 1988.
 Secrets: Short Stories. New Victoria Publishers. 1990.
 Every Woman's Dream: Short Fiction. New Victoria Publishers. 1994.
 Out pho the Closet and Nothing to Wear. University of California. 1997.
 Girls Will be Girls: A Novella and Short Stories. Alyson Books. 2000.
 She Loves Me, She Loves Me Not: Romantic Fiction. Alyson Books. 2002.
 The Best Short Stories of Leslea Newman. Alyson Books. 2003.

Poetry collections 

 Love Me LIke You Mean It: Poems. The University of California. 1987. 
 Sweet Dark Places. Windstorm Collective. 1991.
 Still Life with Buddy: A Novel Told in Fifty Poems. Pride Publications. 1997.
 The Little Butch Book. New Victoria Publishers. 1998. 
 Lambda Literary Award Nominee for Lesbian Poetry
 Signs of Love. Windstorm Creative. 2000. 
 Lambda Literary Award Nominee for Lesbian Poetry
 Nobody's Mother. Orchard House Press. November 2008.
 October Mourning: A Song for Matthew Shepard. Candlewick Press. September 25, 2012. 
 Goodreads Choices Award Nominee for Poetry
 I Remember: Hachiko Speaks. Finishing Line Press. September 19, 2013.
 I Carry My Mother. Headmistress Press. January 2, 2015.
 Lovely. Headmistress Press. January 2, 2018.
 I Wish My Father. Headmistress Press. January 2, 2021.

Nonfiction 

 SomeBody to Love: A Guide to Loving the Body You Have. Third Side Press. 1991. 
 Eating Our Hearts Out: Personal Accounts of Women's Relationship to Food. Crossing Press. March 1, 1993.
 The Femme Mystique. Alyson Books. June 1, 1995.
 Write from the Heart: Inspiration and Exercises for Women who Want to Write. Ten Speed Press. 2003.

Editor 

 A Loving Testimony: Remembering Loved Ones Lost to AIDS: An Anthology. Crossing Press. April 11, 1995. 
 Lambda Literary Award Nominee for Anthologies/Nonfiction (1996)
 My Lover is a Woman. Ballantine Books. 1996.
 Pillow Talk: Lesbian Stories Between the Covers. Alyson Books. May 1, 1998.
 Pillow Talk II: More Lesbian Stories Between the Covers. Alyson Books. July 1, 2000.
 Bedroom Eyes: Stories of Lesbians in the Boudoir. Alyson Books. November 1, 2002.
 Sappho (Gay & Lesbian Writers Series). Chelsea House Pub. March 1, 2005.

Contributor 

 Women on Women: An Anthology of American Lesbian Short Fiction. Plume. May 30, 1990.
 Bubbe Meisehs by Shayneh Maidelehs: An Anthology of Poetry by Jewish Grandaughters About Our Grandmothers. HerBooks. December 1, 1991.
 Xanadu. Tor Books. March 15, 1994.
 Garden Variety Dykes: Lesbian Traditions in Gardening. HerBooks. April 1, 1994.
 Not the Only One. Alyson Books. January 1, 1995.
 Am I Blue?: Coming Out from the Silence. HarperTeen. April 15, 1995. 
 Stonewall Book Award for Literature (1995)
 Lambda Literary Award for Young Adult / Children's Book (1995)
 Minnesota Book Award for Older Children (1995)
 Set in Stone: Butch-On-Butch Erotica. Alyson Books. May 1, 2001.
 Back to Basics: A Butch-Femme Anthology. Bella Books. April 1, 2004.
 Mentsh: On Being Jewish and Queer. Alyson Books. August 15, 2004.
 Becoming Myself: Reflections on Growing Up Female. Hachette Books. April 17, 2007.
 Things Invisible to See. Circlet Press. February 25, 2015.
 HYSTERIA: Writing the Female Body. Lucky Bastard Press. June 15, 2016.
 Conversing with Cancer: How to Ask Questions, Find and Share Information, and Make the Best Decisions. Peter Lang Us. January 17, 2018.
 We Will Not Be Silenced: The Lived Experience of Sexual Harassment and Sexual Assault Told Powerfully Through Poetry, Prose, Essay, and Art. Indie Blu(e) Publishing. November 27, 2018.
 No Voice Too Small: Fourteen Young Americans Making History. Charlesbridge Publishing September 22, 2020.

Awards 
Leslea Newman's literary awards include Creative Writing Fellowships from the National Endowment for the Arts and the Massachusetts Artists Foundation, the James Baldwin award for Cultural Achievement, the Dog Writers Association of America's Best Book of Fiction Award, and a Parents' Choice Silver Medal. Nine of her books have been Lambda Literary Award finalists. In 2009 she received the Alice B. Award.  Her set of children's picture books Mommy, Mama, and Me and Daddy, Papa and Me were 2010 Stonewall Honor Books as well as her 2013 October Mourning: A Song for Matthew Shepherd. In 2019, she received a National Jewish Book Award for Gittel's Journey: An Ellis Island Story.

She was the inaugural judge of the Naugatuck River Review Narrative Poetry Prize.

See also

Fat Chance
 LGBT culture in New York City
 List of LGBT people from New York City

References

Further reading 
 
 Day, Frances Ann (2000). Lesbian and Gay Voices: An Annotated Bibliography and Guide to Literature for Children and Young Adults. Greenwood Press. pp. 188–190. .

External links

Lesléa Newman

American children's writers
Jewish American writers
American lesbian writers
LGBT Jews
1955 births
Living people
American women children's writers
Jewish women writers
American women editors
Writers from Brooklyn
LGBT people from New York (state)
21st-century American Jews
21st-century American women writers